Guy Smith is an American former Negro league pitcher who played in the 1930s.

Smith played for the Indianapolis ABCs in 1939. In three recorded appearances on the mound, he posted a 4.09 ERA over 22 innings.

References

External links
 and Seamheads

Year of birth missing
Place of birth missing
Atlanta Black Crackers players
Baseball pitchers